Ivor Preece (15 December 1920 – 14 March 1987) was an English rugby union footballer who represented and captained England Schools, England and Coventry. He is the only Coventry RFC player to have achieved this accolade. He was selected to play with the British and Irish Lions, on their tour to New Zealand and Australia in 1950.

Born in Coventry in Warwickshire (now in the West Midlands), he attended Broad Street School, Foleshill, Coventry playing in the schools successful side winning the Coventry F.C Shield one of the oldest trophies played for in schoolboy rugby throughout the world being established in 1897. 
Once his playing career was over he still dedicated himself to the game of rugby union serving as president for Coventry Schools, Warwickshire RFU, Coventry R.F.C. and Broadstreet RFC from 1970 until his death in 1987. Preece's son, Peter Preece, was also an England rugby union international who played for Coventry - he was capped 12 times between 1972 and 1976.

Broadstreet RFC honoured Preece by naming their ground the Ivor Preece Field after him.

International matches played
England
  1948, 1950, 1951
  1948, 1949, 1950
  1948, 1949, 1950, 1951
  1950, 1951

British Lions
 1950

Lions
1950 British Lions tour to New Zealand and Australia

References

External links
http://www.lionsrugby.com/6567.php
http://www.lionsrugby.com/6012.php?player=17293&includeref=dynamic
https://web.archive.org/web/20090330100811/http://www.broadstreet-rugby.co.uk/the-club/history/ivor-preece.html

1920 births
1987 deaths
English rugby union players
English rugby union coaches
Rugby union fly-halves
Rugby union players from Coventry
British & Irish Lions rugby union players from England
England international rugby union players
English people of Welsh descent